The  is a municipal junior college in Akita City, Japan, established in 1995.

Academic departments
 Craft and arts
 Industrial design

External links
  

Educational institutions established in 1995
Public universities in Japan
Universities and colleges in Akita Prefecture
Japanese junior colleges
1995 establishments in Japan
Buildings and structures in Akita (city)